A list of Western films released in the 2010s.

TV shows of the 2010s
See: List of Western television series

References

2010
Western